Ojigi (also Ojiji) was Alaafin of the Yoruba Oyo Empire (in what is now Nigeria) from 1724-1735.

Alaafin Ojigi's rule began Oyo's "great age of conquest". His reign is also considered the peak of imperial success, and Ojigi enjoyed the strong support of several important chiefs. Ojigi launched four military incursions against the Kingdom of Dahomey after the receiving requests for assistance from other kingdoms who were threatened by Agaja, the Dahomean king. In 1730 the Dahomeans agreed to begin paying an annual tribute of forty men, women, guns, and four hundred loads of cowries and corals to Oyo.

Ojigi reportedly failed to control the behaviour of his Aremo (first-born prince), and was therefore formally rejected by the Oyo Mesi (the principal counselors of state). After Ojigi died, the Aremo was required to commit suicide.

Ojigi was succeeded by Gberu.

References

Alaafins of Oyo
18th-century rulers in Africa
18th-century Nigerian people
Yoruba monarchs
Yoruba warriors